Hamahanot Haolim is the first youth study group with Zionistic and socialistic philosophy to be founded in Israel. Since its inception in 1929, members of Hamahanot Haolim have continually worked to promote a wide range of projects that benefit Israeli society. There are currently over fifty branches throughout Israel and over 10,000 members.

History
The group’s history began at the Herzliyah Gymnasium School in Tel Aviv. The Herzliyah Gymnasium School, which opened its doors in 1905 in Jaffa and then moved to the Ahuzat Bait neighborhood in 1909, was the first Hebrew high school in the world. At that time, it was common for high school graduates to travel overseas for vacation or continuing education, rather than staying in Palestine, where conditions were may have been more difficult. In 1926, a group of 11 high school students, wanted to not only take an active part in establishing the State of Israel, but were interested in instilling the same Zionistic spirit in others.  Looking for meaning in their bourgeois life, they formed an after-school group which focused on realizing Zionistic and social ideologies in Israel. Between the years 1926 and 1930, the group grew, spreading to Jerusalem, Haifa and other areas of Israel. During these years, however, various factions broke off to form or join other youth groups with varying focuses. In 1930 the group joined forces with the Legion of Scouts in Jerusalem, but in 1931 they formally established the national group: Hamahanot Haolim, which is called Model Government in English.

In June 2012, the group was expelled from the International Falcon Movement – Socialist Educational International "since they did not end their activities in the settlements in occupied Palestine".

Goals
Hamahanot Haolim works towards bettering Israeli society by promoting social equality. To do so, it enables and encourages members to become active in projects that benefit Israeli society.

Activities

In 1932, Hamahanot Haolim established Kibbutz Beit HaShita in the Harod Valley at the southeastern edge of the eastern part of the Jezreel Valley. Since then, it has established 41 other kibbutzim.

Over the past 80 years, Hamahanot Haolim has worked with other youth movements and has changed its name several times, but it has remained true to the founders’ Zionistic and socialistic ideologies. And in 1990, the group that was established by city-dwellers, opened its first membership groups in kibbutzim.

Today, there are active Hamahanot Haolim branches all over Israel, in cities, villages and kibbutzim. Members of encouraged to take responsibility for their contributions to the realization of the furthering of pluralism, Zionism and social equality in Israel and take part in a wide variety of local, regional and national activities such as community activities, seminars, hikes and camps. They are also involved in international activities, such as a Holocaust remembrance trip to Poland open to high school juniors.

Senior members of Hamahanot Haolim direct the activities at the various branches and the overall organization of the movement. Group leaders and senior members hold a National Conference once every four years. During the conference, in addition to analyzing past activities they explore issues relating to the current socio-economic situation in the country in order to adjust goals so that subsequent programming will impact relevant issues. In order to monitor the progress of the various branches in achieving the goals set at the national seminars, and to provide an opportunity for idea sharing and cooperation among branches, branch leaders and senior membership attend both monthly and yearly meetings.

References

External links
 Hamahanot Haolim official website (Hebrew)

Youth organizations based in Israel
Jewish youth organizations
Zionist youth movements
Labor Zionism